"Never Too Late" is a song by Canadian rock band Three Days Grace. It was released on May 7, 2007 as the third single from the band's second album One-X.

Background
"Never Too Late" is about not giving up. Adam Gontier stated, "I guess it's like feeling like you're at the end of your rope and deciding whether or not to completely give up or whether or not to try and sort of keep making it through another day." According to bassist Brad Walst, "Never Too Late" was the first track written from One-X.

On October 23, 2007, Three Days Grace released a single featuring "Never Too Late" and two Clear Channel acoustic recordings of "Pain" and "I Hate Everything About You". On February 12, 2008, an EP was released through iTunes containing the album version of "Never Too Late", an acoustic version and the music video.

The song was featured in a promo for the television show Eleventh Hour.

Radio censorship
The track managed to resurge in pop airplay, peaking at number 14 on Mediabase, and was added by the pop stations in the US, Z100 and Y100. It is the only song to be released to Mainstream Top 40 radio since their 2003 hit "I Hate Everything About You" peaked at number 28 and "Never Too Late" hit number 12. Certain radio stations and Sirius XM The Pulse play a version of the song which censors the phrase "end your life" in the chorus to "change your life" to eliminate the suicide reference from the song. It also quiets the heaviness of the guitar.

Music video
The video begins with a little girl (played by Matreya Fedor) in her room dancing with her parents. This child is portrayed to be Adam Gontier's younger sister, Katelynn Gontier. Later, it shows her older self (played by Adam Gontier's then-wife, Naomi Brewer) struggling against doctors as they strap her down to a hospital bed. As they restrain her, the woman looks toward her younger self dancing with her parents (through the woman's eyes, her young-self appears to have sprouted or be wearing monarch butterfly wings on her back while dancing). The video then cuts to her younger self, showing a man touching her and she smiles hesitantly. The video shows her dancing with her parents, who have bandages over their eyes, signifying that they don't know what is going on. Later, hands marks covered in a black substance are seen all over her, her bedroom, and the man's hand. It is revealed that she was sexually abused as a child, explaining her traumatic breakdown when she is older. As the woman remains strapped helplessly to her hospital bed, the straps from head-to-toe are replaced with the man's hands. Her younger self is shown again; hiding in her room from her attacker, who lifts up the bed to find the girl lying in a fetal position when she sees an angel who fights off the man, scattering his feathers over the girl's room in the process. This was explained to be Adam fighting off his dad from hurting his sister, as Adam and his sister were living in a bad environment at home in their childhood. As the angel's feathers rain down on the grown woman's bed and the man's hands – in place of the straps – lose their grip on her and die (in reference of the attacker's defeat by the angel), eventually her older self is able to overcome her fear and leaves the hospital bed smiling, while her younger self goes back to her own bed. 

The music video was directed by Tony Petrossian and has 250 million views on YouTube as of November 2022.

Chart performance
The song reached the number one spot on the Canadian MuchMusic Countdown on June 29 for one week. It also reached the top of the Billboard Hot Mainstream Rock Tracks chart. This is the band's most successful song from One-X, despite the fact that their prior hits "Just Like You" (from their self-titled album), "Animal I Have Become", "Pain" and a few singles that were less successful did better on the Billboard Hot 100 chart. This is due to "Never Too Late" peaking at number 71, where "Just Like You" peaked at number 55, "Animal I Have Become" at number 60 and "Pain" at number 44. Despite not hitting number one on the Alternative Airplay chart, it was more successful than any of the singles from One-X and stayed longer on the charts than their number one hits at 43 weeks, beating "Animal I Have Become" by two weeks and "Pain" by a hefty 13 weeks. It is the band's second most successful song only behind "I Hate Everything About You" on the rock charts at 45 weeks.

The song is also the band's only cross-over hit to date charting on both the Mainstream Top 40 and Adult Top 40 formats at number 12 and number 13 respectively. The song peaked at number 30 on the Canadian Hot 100 chart.

Awards and nominations
The song was nominated for 2 awards at the 2007 MuchMusic Video Awards for "Best Video" and "Best Rock Video". The song won a BDS Certified Spin Award based on the 100,000 spins it received in November 2007. The song was listed in Loudwire's "66 Best Hard Rock Songs of the 21st Century" in 2020.

Track listing

Credits and personnel
Credits for "Never Too Late" adapted from AllMusic.

Three Days Grace
Adam Gontier – lead vocals, acoustic guitar
Barry Stock – lead guitar
Brad Walst – bass
Neil Sanderson – drums, backing vocals

Production
Howard Benson - producer
Gavin Brown - producer
Michael Tedesco - A&R

Charts

Weekly charts

Year-end charts

Certifications

References

External links

2006 songs
2007 singles
Three Days Grace songs
Jive Records singles
Rock ballads
Songs about suicide
Music videos directed by Tony Petrossian
Songs written by Adam Gontier
Songs about depression